Luis Fernando Puente Prado (born 13 February 2003) is a Mexican professional footballer who plays as a forward for Liga MX club Guadalajara. He was included in The Guardian's "Next Generation 2020".

Club career
Puente joined Guadalajara's youth academy after Chivas scouts spotted him in a local tournament in 2014. Puente debuted with Guadalajara's reserve side, Tapatío, in a 1–0 Liga de Expansión MX loss to Tepatitlán F.C. on 1 October 2020.

International career
Puente was part of the under-17 squad that participated at the 2019 U-17 World Cup, scoring one goal, where Mexico finished runner-up.

Career statistics

Club

Honours
Mexico U17
FIFA U-17 World Cup runner-up: 2019

References

External links

2003 births
Living people
People from Colima City
Mexican footballers
Mexico youth international footballers
Association football forwards
C.D. Guadalajara footballers